The International Institute for Conservation of Historic and Artistic Works (IIC) is a global organisation for conservation and restoration professionals with over two thousand members in over fifty countries. IIC seeks to promote the knowledge, methods and working standards needed to protect and preserve historic and artistic works throughout the world.

Organisation and governance 
The current Council of the institute (2019-2020) is:

Officers:
 President - Julian Bickersteth (Australia)
 Vice-President - Amber Kerr (Lunder Conservation Center - Smithsonian American Art Museum USA)
 Vice-President - Austin Nevin (University of Gothenburg Sweden)
 Vice-President - Sandra Smith (British Museum United Kingdom)
 Secretary-General - Jane Henderson (Cardiff University (United Kingdom)
 Treasurer - Juergen Vervoorst (The National Archives (United Kingdom))
 Director of Publications - Joyce Townsend (Tate (United Kingdom))
 Director of Communications - Amber Kerr (Lunder Conservation Center - Smithsonian American Art Museum USA)
 Director of Membership - David Saunders (United Kingdom)

Ordinary Members of Council
 Alice Tsang (Conservation Section of the Hong Kong Leisure and Cultural Services Department)
 Eleonora Nagy (USA)
 Helen Griffiths (United Kingdom)
 Rachel Sabino (Art Institute of Chicago USA)
 Isobel Griffin (National Galleries of Scotland United Kingdom)
 Satish Pandey (National Museum Institute, National Museum, New Delhi, India)
Lorinda Wong (Getty Conservation Institute, USA)

 President Emeritus - Sarah Staniforth (National Trust, ret'd)
 Honorary Member of Council - Jirong Song (Palace Museum, Forbidden City, China)

IIC's Council attempts to reflect the geographical and professional balance of the worldwide conservation profession. Council members, including the secretary-general and treasurer, are volunteers, as are the editors of Studies in Conservation and IIC's Congress preprints. The institute has a permanent secretariat in London with a staff of three.

IIC co-operates closely with other organisations in the field, notably the International Centre for the Study of the Preservation and Restoration of Cultural Property and the Committee for Conservation of the International Council of Museums (ICOM) as well as national and regional conservation groups.

IIC is a learned society and is also registered with the Charity Commission for England and Wales.

Background 
In 1930, the International Museums Office of the League of Nations held a conference in Rome on the examination and conservation of works of art. Following this meeting, the Museums Office issued a series of publications on the subject. In 1932 a technical journal of conservation studies, Technical Studies in the Field of the Fine Arts, was established by the Fogg Museum (Harvard University), under the managing editorship of George L. Stout. It continued publication until 1942.

The work of the Monuments, Fine Arts, and Archives program and the repatriation of art treasures after World War II brought together experts from Europe and the United States. They proposed the revival of Technical Studies and the formation of an international body of conservators to continue the interchange of information on the care and conservation of works of art. Between 1946 and 1948 a series of meetings was held to discuss these proposals. Foremost among those involved in the meetings were George L. Stout, W.G. Constable (Boston), Ian Rawlins (London), and Paul Coremans (Brussels).

In December 1948 at a meeting of the ICOM Commission on the Care of Paintings in London, it was announced that a new international institute for conservation was about to be incorporated with offices in London and that its interests would be the scientific and technical study of the subject.

Early history 
On April 27, 1950, the International Institute for the Conservation of Museum Objects (which acquired its present name in 1959) was incorporated as a limited company in the United Kingdom. Its aims were "to improve the state of knowledge and standards of practice and to provide a common meeting ground and publishing body for all who are interested in and professionally skilled in the conservation of museum objects”. The institute was to be concerned with:
 The status of conservators, by forming a professional self-electing body
 Publications: abstracts of the technical literature, and original work with a scientific bias - the end of the "secrets of the Old Masters"
 Training, with the aim of raising standards.

The office was established with the help of a grant from the Nuffield Foundation. London was chosen as the "midpoint" between the United States and continental Europe. Office space was provided free by the Trustees of the National Gallery (London). The Institute moved to its own independent offices in 1968.

The membership was to consist of Fellows who were to be persons highly qualified in (or in positions of great authority in) conservation and Associates who were to be "persons anxious to promote the objects of the Institute". Later a category of Institutional Members was introduced.

When the IIC was founded in 1950, the Founder Fellows were George L. Stout, Rutherford J. Gettens, Richard Buck, W.G. Constable, Murray Pease, Ian Rawlins, Harold Plenderleith, Sir Wallace Akers, Helmut Ruhemann, and Paul Coremans. Others who joined in that first year included Arthur van Schendel, René Sneyers, and Sheldon and Caroline Keck. George Stout became the IIC's first president, with Harold Plenderleith its treasurer and Ian Rawlins its secretary-general.

The IIC membership grew quickly. In October 1952 there were 62 members (38 of them Fellows) with 64 candidates for associate membership in process of election; by March 1952, there were 167 members (50 of them Fellows).

Membership 
 IIC Fellows are senior members of the profession who are elected by the existing body of Fellows. Fellowship of IIC is open to all members who are actively engaged in the profession of conservation. Fellows must be able to demonstrate commitment to the profession and to show that they keep up-to-date with relevant developments. Indicators include publications, voluntary service to conservation organisations, participation in conferences and training events, membership of other relevant professional bodies, and accreditation by a national organisation.

 IIC Individual membership is open to those working in conservation and with an interest in conserving the world's heritage.
 Student membership of IIC is for those enrolled in a full-time programme of education, training or work experience under the supervision of a professional conservator.
 Institutional IIC membership is intended for museum and galleries, libraries and archives, conservation schools, research institutes and commercial firms.

Publications  & Communications 
In May 1952, the first issue of the IIC Newsletter appeared; this later became the IIC Bulletin and in turn was succeeded in 2007 by News in Conservation. In October 1952, Studies in Conservation began publication. IIC Abstracts, an international journal of abstracts of the technical literature and the forerunner of Art and Archaeology Technical Abstracts, was first published in 1955. With changing editorship, it ran for five volumes ending with Vol.5, no.4 (Autumn 1965). In 2000, the first volume of the annual Reviews in Conservation was published and this was published until Vol. 10 in 2009..

Studies in Conservation 
Studies in Conservation is a peer-reviewed academic journal, produced eight times a year, on the conservation of historic and artistic works. Studies in Conservation  publishes original work on a range of subjects including, but not limited to, advances in conservation practice, novel methods of treatment, preventive conservation, issues of collection care, conservation history and ethics, examination methods for works of art, new research in the analysis of artistic materials or mechanisms of deterioration, and conservation issues in display and storage.

Reviews in Conservation 
Published annually from 2000 until 2010, Reviews in Conservation has now been incorporated into Studies in Conservation.

News in Conservation 
News in Conservation is published electronically every other month. It aims to provide a place where opinions, news, and information can be shared and discussed. Free to the general public for download from the IIC web-site, News in Conservation contains news from the IIC Council and regional groups, as well as job vacancies, conference listings, and notices, along with a mixture of news stories, features, interviews, and other articles relating to all aspects of conservation in every issue.

Social Networking
IIC operates a lively Facebook page and Twitter and LinkedIn presence as well as a discussion group on LinkedIn.  These allow for the rapid sharing of conservation news and events and, at LinkedIn, an active discussion forum for conservation issues and topics

Biennial Congresses
In 1961, with the help of a grant from the Gulbenkian Foundation, the IIC held its first international conference. That meeting, in Rome, was attended by 150 people, and the papers were published by Butterworths under the title Recent Advances in Conservation. Subsequently, conferences have been held at two- or three-year intervals with published preprints on a topic of current interest. Past conferences are:

Student & Emerging Conservator Conferences
In 2011 IIC instigated its Student & Emerging Conservator Conference series. These events are aimed at helping recent graduates and those still studying conservation to develop their skills and gain valuable career insights. They offer invaluable networking opportunities and panel discussions with webcasts, studio visits and a lively social programme.

The first conference in this series was
 Conservation: Futures and Responsibilities (London 2011)
This was followed by:
  Conservation: Obstacles or Opportunities? (Copenhagen, 2013)
  Conservation: Making the Transition (Warsaw 2015)
  Head, Hands & Heart (Bern, 2017)
  The Conservator's Reflection (Cologne, 2019)
The Faces of Conservation (Lisbon, 2021 Online)

Regional groups 
IIC's Regional Groups began in 1958. Regional Groups are independent associations affiliated or associated with IIC. A Regional Group is required to adhere to the aims and objectives of the IIC as expressed in the Memorandum of Association. Its by-laws must be approved by the IIC Council and its officers should be members of IIC. The first Regional Groups formed were the IIC-United Kingdom Group (now Icon, the Institute of Conservation) and the IIC-American Group (now the American Institute for Conservation). There are currently Regional Groups in Scandinavia, Austria, Croatia, France, Greece, Italy, Japan, and Spain.

Sustainability and Environmental Guidelines

Positioning Statement 
Following Our Common Future: Report of the World Commission on Environment and Development (1987), also known as 'The Brundtland Report', and Stephen Dovers, former Director of the Fenner School of Environment and Society at the Australian National University, the IIC understands sustainability to comprise seven 'Interlocking Crises': Biodiversity Loss; Climate Change; Global Security; Pollution and Wastes; Population; Poverty and Development; and Resource Use.

IIC  Environmental Sustainability Statement and Carbon Analysis 
IIC aims to decrease its carbon footprint as far as practicably possible. 2030 is the deadline for Scope 1 and 2 emissions with Scope 3 emissions for 2050.

IIC and ICOM-CC Joint Declaration for Environmental Guidelines 
A joint declaration on environmental guidelines between the International Institute for Conservation (IIC) and the International Council of Museums, Committee for Conservation (ICOM-CC) was published in September 2014, following discussion at the ICOM-CC Melbourne Conference (September 15–19, 2014) and IIC Hong Kong Congress (September 22–26, 2014). The declaration covers:
 Sustainability and Management
 Museum Environment
 Loans
 Existing Guidelines

IIC, ICOM-CC and ICCROM Joint Commitment for Climate Action 
This agreement between the International Institute for Conservation (IIC), the International Council of Museums - Committee for Conservation (ICOM-CC) and the International Centre for the Study of the Preservation and Restoration of Cultural Property (ICCROM) organizes an international coalition to make changes and act towards sustainability and net zero initiatives.

MoU with Climate Heritage Network 
IIC has signed an MoU with the Climate Heritage Network to help mitigate issues related to climate change.

See also
 Cultural heritage
 Art conservation and restoration
 List of dates in the history of conservation and restoration
 Conservation Associations and Professional Organizations

References

External links 
 

Organizations established in 1950
Heritage organizations
Conservation and restoration organizations
History organisations based in the United Kingdom